Global Savings Group GmbH (GSG) is a privately held international commerce content and affiliate marketing company, that combines multiple savings portals in over 20 countries. The company owns CupoNation as well as further discount code and deal sites across Europe, and operates coupon portals for publishing houses. 
GSG has won the German Deloitte’s Technology Fast 50 award and was included in Deloitte’s Technology Fast 500 EMEA list in 2017. In 2016, the company generated $546 million in sales for retailers. The company is headquartered in Munich, Germany.

History
The Global Savings Group was founded in 2012 by Andreas Fruth, Adrian Renner, and Gerhard Trautmann together with Rocket Internet. They had also previously collaborated on Dropgifts GmbH, a site that allowed users to engage in social and mobile gifting. In 2016 the company changed its name from CupoNation Group. In 2019, Global Savings Group acquired the UK-based money-saving browser extension provider Pouch for a cash purchase in the 7-figure US dollar range. 
In 2020, Global Savings Group acquired French cashback company iGraal for €123.5 million. In 2021, the company acquired Berlin-based platform Shoop for an undisclosed amount. December 2022, Global Savings Group and Pepper.com joined forces

References 

Companies based in Munich
2012_establishments_in_Germany